The Private Secretary (German: Die Privatsekretärin) is a 1931 German musical film directed by Wilhelm Thiele and starring Renate Müller, Hermann Thimig and Felix Bressart.

The film's sets were designed by Otto Hunte and Franz Koehn.

An English-language version Sunshine Susie was made, also starring Renate Müller. A French-language version Dactylo and an Italian-language  The Private Secretary were also made. The film was remade in 1953. It was based on a 1905 novel by István Szomaházy.

Cast
 Renate Müller as Vilma Förster 
 Hermann Thimig as Bankdirektor Arvai 
 Felix Bressart as Bankdiener Hasel 
 Ludwig Stössel as Personalchef Klapper 
 Gertrud Wolle as Pensionsmutter

Other film versions
 Tales of the Typewriter (December 1916, Hungary, directed by Alexander Korda)
 Dactylo (April 1931, France, directed by Wilhelm Thiele)
 The Private Secretary (July 1931, Italy, directed by Goffredo Alessandrini)
 Sunshine Susie (December 1931, United Kingdom, directed by Victor Saville)
 The Private Secretary (December 1953, West Germany, directed by Paul Martin)

References

External links

1931 films
Films of the Weimar Republic
1931 musical films
Films directed by Wilhelm Thiele
1930s German-language films
German multilingual films
Films based on Hungarian novels
Bavaria Film films
German black-and-white films
Films with screenplays by Franz Schulz
Films scored by Paul Abraham
German musical films
1931 multilingual films
1930s German films